Iain Jennings is a British keyboard player, known for being a member of the progressive rock bands Mostly Autumn (from 1995 until 2006, and again from 2007 to present) and Breathing Space (from 2005 to 2011). In 2017, Jennings released his album, The House, featuring Mark Chatterton, Bryan Josh, Anne-Marie Helder, Alex Cromarty and Stuart Fletcher. From early 2019, Jennings started a new project with solo artist Marc Atkinson.

In August 2020, Jennings joined the rock band The Tower Radio, with Pete Godson, Alun Hughes and Andy 'Rob' Swan.

Discography

Solo
Breathing Space* (2005)
My Dark Surprise (2013)
The House (2017)
(*Whilst this album shares its name with the band led by Jennings, it was recorded as a solo album before the band had formed.)

Breathing Space
Coming Up for Air (2007)
Below the Radar (2009)

Mostly Autumn
 For All We Shared... (1998)
 The Spirit of Autumn Past (1999)
 The Last Bright Light (2001)
 Music Inspired by The Lord of the Rings (2001)
 Passengers (2003)
 Storms Over Still Water (2005)
 Go Well Diamond Heart (2010)
 The Ghost Moon Orchestra

External links
The official Breathing Space homepage
The official Mostly Autumn homepage

Living people
British rock keyboardists
British songwriters
Progressive rock keyboardists
Year of birth missing (living people)